Kilive Naloli (born 26 September 1975) is a Fijian-born Japanese rugby union player. He plays as a centre. He played for the Japan national rugby sevens team in the 2003-04 IRB Sevens World Series and in the 2005 Rugby World Cup Sevens.

External links
7人制ラグビーワールドカップアジア地区予選 7人制日本代表
Rugby Watching Traveler's Guide

1975 births
Living people
Fijian rugby union players
Japanese rugby union players
Fijian rugby sevens players
Japanese rugby sevens players
Fijian expatriates in Japan
Rugby union centres
Japan international rugby union players
Japan international rugby sevens players